Aviptadil is an injectable synthetic formulation of human vasoactive intestinal peptide (VIP). 
VIP was discovered in 1970, and has been used to treat various inflammatory conditions, such as acute respiratory distress syndrome (ARDS), asthma, and chronic obstructive pulmonary disease (COPD).

Regulatory history

ARDS in COVID-19 
Studies have found that aviptadil may be beneficial for severely ill patients with COVID-19 related ARDS. ACTIV-3, a trial examining aviptadil acetate (Zyesami), is recruiting patients . A separate trial is examining inhaled aviptadil for patients with high risk for ARDS, is ongoing . A trial for intravenous aviptadil for the same indication concluded in February 2021.

US-Israeli NeuroRx Inc partnered with Relief Therapeutics to develop aviptadil in the United States. In June 2020, the U.S. Food and Drug Administration granted fast-track designation to aviptadil for the treatment of respiratory distress in COVID-19. In September 2020, NeuroRX submitted a request for an Emergency Use Authorization to the US FDA for its use in patients in intensive care.May 2021: NRx Pharmaceuticals Announces Positive Results for ZYESAMI™ (aviptadil-acetate) and Submits Emergency Use Authorization Application to USFDA to Treat Critical COVID-19 in Patients Suffering from Respiratory Failure.

Jan 2021: Zuventus healthcare Ltd seeks approval for aviptadil from India's drug controller for emergency use in COVID-19 treatment. Mumbai's Zuventus Healthcare Ltd. has got the nod to conduct Phase 3 clinical trials of aviptadil injectable formulation. The SEC noted that Zuventus had presented revised Phase 3 clinical trial protocol before the committee, and after "detailed deliberation", it recommended grant of permission of Phase 3 trials with the drug.

April 2022: The Central Licensing Authority, DCGI granted avipatdil manufacturing and marketing permission to Zuventus Healthcare Ltd under the brand name 'Oxyptadil', for treatment in patients with severe COVID-19 with ARDS.

Aviptadil/phentolamine combination for Erectile Dysfunction (ED) 
October 2000 UK (Invicorp): aviptadil, in combination with the adrenergic drug phentolamine, is approved as an effective alternative therapy for erectile dysfunction (ED) patients. One dose intracavernosal injection contains 25 micrograms aviptadil and 2 mg of phentolamine mesilate for the treatment of ED. Aviptadil dose used for treatment of erectile dysfunction is a lot smaller than that for the treatment of ARDS.

Vasoactive intestinal peptide (VIP) 

Vasoactive intestinal peptide (VIP) is a 28-residue amino acid peptide first characterized in 1970 that was initially isolated from porcine duodenum. A member of the secretin/glucagon hormone superfamily. VIP was initially discovered owing to its potent vasodilatory effects (as its name implies). VIP is widely distributed in the central and peripheral nervous system as well as in the digestive, respiratory, reproductive, and cardiovascular systems as a neurotransmitter and neuroendocrine releasing factor. These effects contribute to an extensive range of physiological and pathological processes related to development, growth, and the control of neuronal, epithelial, and endocrine cell function.

VIP receptors 
VIP acts on two receptors - VPAC1 and VPAC2, which are class B of G-protein-coupled receptors (GPCRs).VPAC1 is mainly present in the lung and T-lymphocytes, whereas VPAC2 is mainly seen in the smooth muscle, mast cells and the basal parts of the lung mucosa.

Expression of VIP 
VIP is produced in the neurons in the central and peripheral nervous systems. VIP is mainly localized in the myenteric and submucosal neurons and nerve terminals in the GI tract. Endogenous VIP is released by numerous stimuli such as acetylcholine (ACh), ATP, serotonin (5-HT), substance P (SP), GLP-2 from at least two populations of VIP-positive nerves: cholinergic and non-cholinergic VIP-releasing nerves. In guinea pig small intestine, most VIP-positive nerves in the mucosa and submucosa are non-cholinergic secretomotor neurons and well colocalized with neuronal nitric oxide synthase (nNOS) in human colonic circular muscles. VIP is also expressed in immune cells, such as activated T cells  and therefore present in lymphoid tissues including Peyer's patches, the spleen, and lymph nodes, in addition to the VIP-ergic innervation in lymphoid tissues. Beside the neuronal source, VIP is also expressed and released from endocrine organs - Heart, Thyroid, Kidney and GI tracts.

Localization of VIP 
 VIP is highly localised in lungs (70%) and binds with alveolar type II (AT II) cells via VPAC1. The biological (vasodilator) activity of vasoactive intestinal peptide (VIP) was discovered in the lungs before the peptide was isolated and chemical identity characterized from intestine. Although VIP levels are considerably high in the brain or gut: VIP is localized in key sites in the lung, has potent activities on its major functions, and appears to play an important role in pulmonary physiology and disease.
 The principal localization of VIP-containing neurons in the tracheobronchial tree is in the smooth muscle layer, around submucosal mucous glands and in the walls of pulmonary and bronchial arteries. Immunoreactive VIP is also present in neuronal cell bodies forming microglia that provide a source of intrinsic innervation of pulmonary structures.

Vasoactive Intestinal Peptide (VIP) and SARS-CoV-2 
VIP is highly localised in lungs and binds with alveolar type II (AT II) cells via VPAC1 receptor. AT II cells constitute only 5% of pulmonary epithelium. Angiotensin Converting Enzyme 2 (ACE 2) surface receptors are present in AT II cells. AT II cells produces surfactant and plays an important role in the maintenance of type 1epithelial cells. SARS-CoV-2 enters into AT II cells by binding to ACE 2 surface receptors with its spike protein. SARS-CoV-2 attacks mainly type II cells resulting in their death. Since AT II cells produce surfactant, this leads to:
 Profound defects in oxygenation,
 Hypoxia

Mechanism of action of Aviptadil 
 AT II cells have a high concentration of ACE 2 receptors on their cell membrane
 Investigators have confirmed that the SARS-CoV family of viruses selectively attack pulmonary Alveolar Type II (ATII) cells because of their ACE2 receptors, in contrast to other pulmonary epithelial cells.
 SARS-CoV Viruses bind to ACE 2 receptors in order to enter the cell. Viral replication and rupture liberates inflammatory cytokines and destroys surfactant production
 VIP binds uniquely to receptors on AT II cells in the lung, the same cells that bind the SARS-CoV-2 virus via their ACE2 receptors
 VIP is heavily concentrated in the lung and binds specifically to VIP receptors on alveolar type II cells. VIP exerts a broad anti-cytokine effect on immune system cells   
 VIP specifically upregulates surfactant production via upregulation of C-Fos protein and protects type II cells from cytokine 
 Upregulating the production of surfactant, the loss of which is increasingly implicated in COVID-19 respiratory failure 
Aviptadil results in rapid clinical recovery in patients with SARS-CoV-2 infection.

Therapeutic effects of Aviptadil on Lungs in COVID-19 patients

Preservation of pulmonary tissue 
Preserving surfactant production in the lung and in protecting type 2 alveolar cells. Significantly delayed the onset of edematous lung injury, effective in preventing ischemia-reperfusion injury, Prevents NMDA-induced caspase-3 activation in the lung.

Inhibits alveolar epithelial cell apoptosis 
VIP is a proven inhibitor of activation-induced perforin, as well as of granzyme B and therefore actively contributes to the reduction of deleterious proinflammatory and cell death-inducing processes, particularly in the lungs. Aviptadil restores barrier function at the endothelial/ alveolar interface and thereby protects the lung and other organs from failure.

VIP promotes synthesis of pulmonary surfactant 
Studies have demonstrated that VIP binds on type II cells and increases the incorporation of methyl-choline into phosphatidylcholine – the major component of the pulmonary surfactants by enhancing the activity of the enzyme choline-phosphate cytidylyltransferase. VIP upregulates C-Fos protein expression in cultured type II alveolar cells, which is instrumental in promoting synthesis of pulmonary surfactant phospholipids (Li 2007) and induces surfactant protein A expression in ATII cells through activation of PKC/c-Fos pathway.

VIP decreases pulmonary inflammation 
Anti-cytokine effect- Inhibits IL-6,TNF-α production and inhibit NF-κB activation. Protects against HCl-induced pulmonary edema.

Pharmacokinetics 
Half-life: 1–2 minutes

Metabolism/ distribution: After injection of 1 µg radioactively-labelled aviptadil as bolus to patients, a very rapid tissue distribution was observed.
Within 30 mins, about 45% of the radioactivity was found in the lungs
Over an observation period of 24 hrs, only minimal activity was detected in the GI tract & almost no activity was found in the liver or spleen.
Radioactivity in the lungs decreased within four hours to 25% and within 24 hours to 10%.

Apparent volume of distribution: 14 ml/kg

Tissue distribution: Aviptadil binds to its receptors in discrete locations within the gastrointestinal, respiratory, and genital tracts. Aviptadil is localized on respiratory epithelium, smooth muscles of the airways, blood vessels and alveolar walls.

Elimination: After injection of radiolabelled aviptadil, radioactivity was almost eliminated by the kidneys: 35% within 4 hours, and 90% within 24 hours.

Aviptadil use- evidence from Studies in ARDS

Phase III Study-Increased Recovery and Survival in Patients With COVID-19 Respiratory Failure Following Treatment with Aviptadil 
A multicenter, randomized, placebo-controlled trial in 196 patients with PCR+ COVID-19 receiving intensive care at 10 U.S. hospitals – 6 tertiary care and 4 regional hospitals  to determine whether intravenous aviptadil is superior to placebo in achieving recovery from respiratory failure and survival at 60 days post treatment. Primary, prespecified endpoint was "alive and free from respiratory failure at day 60."
Across all patients and sites of care, patients treated with aviptadil were significantly more likely to be alive and free from respiratory failure at 60 days, compared to those treated with placebo (P=.02) and demonstrated improvement in survival alone (P<.001). Advantages in survival for aviptadil-treated patients were seen in both the subgroup classified as 2 on the National Institute of Allergy and Infectious Disease (NIAID) ordinal scale (58.6% vs. 0%; p=.001) and the NIAID=3 subgroup (83.1% vs. 62.8%; p=.03). Among patients who recovered successfully, those treated with Aviptadil had a median 10-day reduction in length of hospital stay compared to placebo patients (P=.025).
Treatment with aviptadil demonstrates multi-dimensional efficacy in improving the likelihood of recovery from respiratory failure and survival to 60 days, and markedly reduced hospital stay in critically ill patients with respiratory failure caused by COVID-19.

Posology and method of administration 
Aviptadil intravenous infusion is administered by infusion pump in escalating doses for 3 successive days
 Day 1 : Aviptadil 0.166 mcg/kg/hr (equivalent to 1 vial of aviptadil Injection)
 Day 2 : Aviptadil 0.332 mcg/kg/hr (equivalent to 2 vials of aviptadil Injection)
 Day 3 : Aviptadil 0.498 mcg/kg/hr (equivalent to 3 vials of aviptadil Injection)
Duration of infusion depends on the patient's body weight
 Body weight < 60 kg - 14 hour infusions of aviptadil at escalating doses on 3 successive days
 Body weight 60 – 90 kg - 12 hour infusions of aviptadil at escalating doses on 3 successive days
 Body weight > 90 kg - 10 hour infusions of aviptadil at escalating doses on 3 successive days

Undesirable Effects 
Gastrointestinal  Disorders - Diarrhea, 
Vascular disorders - Hypotension, cutaneous flushing, facial flushing &
Infusion related reactions

References 

Erectile dysfunction drugs
Peptide hormones
Drugs acting on the respiratory system